I Want Out may refer to:
 I Want Out (Helloween song)
 I Want Out (Matchbox song)
 I Want Out, a single by Young Guns